Earl of Birkenhead was a title in the Peerage of the United Kingdom. It was created in 1922 for the noted lawyer and Conservative politician F. E. Smith, 1st Viscount Birkenhead. He was Solicitor-General in 1915, Attorney-General from 1915 to 1919 and Lord High Chancellor of Great Britain from 1919 to 1922. Smith had already been created a Baronet in the Baronetage of the United Kingdom in 1918, Baron Birkenhead, of Birkenhead in the County of Chester, in 1919, Viscount Birkenhead, of Birkenhead in the County of Chester, in 1921, and was made Viscount Furneaux, of Charlton in the County of Northampton, at the same time as he was given the earldom. The three peerages, like the earldom, were in the Peerage of the United Kingdom. Viscount Furneaux was used as the courtesy title by the heir apparent to the earldom; the title of this viscountcy derived from the maiden name of Lord Birkenhead's wife.

He was succeeded by his only son, the second Earl. He was also a Conservative politician and held minor office under Neville Chamberlain and Winston Churchill. However, Lord Birkenhead is best remembered as a biographer. He was succeeded by his only son, the third Earl. Like his father he was a biographer. He never married and the titles became extinct on his early death in 1985. The second Earl's daughter, Lady Juliet Townsend, was Lord Lieutenant of Northamptonshire.

Birkenhead was a member of the committee for the 1924 Olympic Games, and more than 50 years after his death he was portrayed by actor Nigel Davenport in the 1981 film Chariots of Fire.

Earls of Birkenhead (1922–1985)
Frederick Edwin Smith, 1st Earl of Birkenhead (1872–1930)
Frederick Winston Furneaux Smith, 2nd Earl of Birkenhead (1907–1975)
Frederick William Robin Smith, 3rd Earl of Birkenhead (1936–1985)

Arms

Notes

References

David Beamish's Peerage page

1922 establishments in the United Kingdom
Extinct earldoms in the Peerage of the United Kingdom
Noble titles created in 1922
Noble titles created for UK MPs
Birkenhead